
Gmina Marklowice is a rural gmina (administrative district) in Wodzisław County, Silesian Voivodeship, in southern Poland.

Neighbouring gminas
Gmina Marklowice is bordered by the towns of Radlin, Rybnik and Wodzisław Śląski, and by the gminas of Mszana and Świerklany.

Twin towns – sister cities

Gmina Marklowice is twinned with:
 Barlin, France

References

Marklowice
Wodzisław County